Order of Saint Maurice was established in 1996 in the pattern of the Cavalry & Armor Association's Order of St. George Medallion and is awarded by the National Infantry Association and the certificate is signed by the Chief of Infantry of the United States Army. It is named after Saint Maurice, the leader of the Roman Theban Legion in the 3rd century.

The five levels of the Order of Saint Maurice are: 
"The Order of Saint Maurice has five levels. A nominee for the Order of Saint Maurice must have served the Infantry community with distinction; must have demonstrated a significant contribution in support of the Infantry; and must represent the highest standards of integrity, moral character, professional competence, and dedication to duty. The same medallion is used for each level, with an attachment that identifies the level."

Primicerius – The highest level, for those who have made a significant contribution to the Infantry. The most significant awardees receive the Doughboy Award. Must be or have been Infantry Branch.
Centurion – For middle level, brigade and battalion officers and NCOs, and special nominees who have made an outstanding contribution to the Infantry. Must be or have been Infantry Branch.
Legionnaire – For outstanding or conspicuous contribution to the Infantry. Non-infantry branch personnel are eligible.
Peregrinus – For foreign military personnel who have served in or supported the U.S. Army Infantry.
Civis – For civilian who have made significant or outstanding contributions to the Infantry.

The Shield of Sparta is an award for spouses who have contributed, in some way, to the Infantry. The Order of Saint Maurice and the Shield of Sparta are awarded by the National Infantry Association and the U.S. Army’s Chief of Infantry (Commanding General of Fort Benning).

Namesake
Saint Maurice was Primicerius of the Theban Legion. In 287 AD it marched in service of the Roman Empire fighting against the revolt in the Berguadae Gauls. His men were composed entirely of Christians recruited from upper Egypt, near the Valley of the Kings. The Legion marched to the Mediterranean Sea, was transported across, and traveled across Italy to an area in Switzerland. Serving under Augustus Maximian Hercules, better known to history as Maximian, Maurice was ordered to have his legionnaires offer pagan sacrifices before battle near the Rhone at Martigny. The Theban Legion refused to participate, and also refused to kill innocent civilians in the conduct of their duty, and withdrew to the town of Agaunum. Enraged, Maximian ordered every tenth man killed, yet they still refused. A second time the General ordered Maurice’s men to participate and again they refused. Maurice declared his earnest desire to obey every order lawful in the eyes of God. “We have seen our comrades killed,” came the reply. “Rather than sorrow, we rejoice at the honor done to them.” At this Maximian ordered the butchery of the Thebans and the martyrdom of Saint Maurice. September 22 is the traditional feast day."

Notable recipients

 Abizaid, John P. – retired general (2000)
 Anderson, Mark E. – major general (2004)
 Bolger, Daniel P. – retired lieutenant general (2013)
 Connelly, William A., 6th sergeant major of the army (1979), OSM Primicerius (Doughboy Award, 2004)
 Dailey, Daniel A., 15th sergeant major of the army (Ret), (2015)
 Dye, Dale A. Jr., retired USMC captain and actor
 Estes, Herbert J., SFC (Ret) U.S. Army Infantry (1998)
 Forbes James G. retired – command sergeant major (2015)
 Gailliard, Amos M. Jr. – served in the Korean War and was a brigadier general in the New York National Guard (2008)
 Houtsma, Gary – mechanical engineer for the United States Department of Defense, awarded for leading the team that developed the Picatinny rail (2014)
 Kristoffersen, Eirik – Chief of Defence, Norway (2015)
  Meyer, Edward C. – former U.S. Army Chief of Staff (1983)
  Moore, Harold G. – retired lieutenant general (1977)
 Perot, Ross H. – U.S. Navy lieutenant, awarded for sponsoring Operation Eagle Claw (1980)
 Petry, Leroy A., retired master sergeant and Medal of Honor recipient (2011)
 Plumley, Basil L. – retired command sergeant major  (1974)
 Powell, Colin L. – retired general and former Secretary of State of the United States (1993)
 Puckett, Ralph Jr. – retired colonel and Medal of Honor recipient (1971)
 Ridgway, Matthew B. – retired general (1955)

Gallery

References

External links
Infantry Association
A complete list of awardees PDF

1996 establishments in the United States
Awards established in 1996
National Infantry Association
Orders, decorations, and medals